Neues vom Tage (English: News of the Day) is a comic opera (Lustige Oper) in three parts by Paul Hindemith, with a German libretto by Marcellus Schiffer.

The opera is a satire of modern life, celebrity and marriage, involving parodies of both Puccini's music and Berlin Kabarett. The opera became notorious for a scene with a naked soprano (Laura) singing in the bath about the wonders of modern plumbing, though Hindemith replaced her with the tenor (Hermann) in the revised version.

The on-stage nudity particularly aroused the ire of Ernst "Putzi" Hanfstängel, Hitler’s musical advisor, and was later indirectly cited by Joseph Goebbels as evidence that the "degenerate art" of "cultural bolshevist" composers should be excluded from Germany.

Performance history
Neues vom Tage was first performed on 8 June 1929, at the Kroll Opera House, Berlin, under the musical direction of Otto Klemperer. Hindemith revised the opera, changing the text and adding a little new music, for the Teatro San Carlo, Naples, on 7 April 1954. The premiere of the work in the United States was at the Santa Fe Opera in 1961.

Roles

Recordings
Hindemith: Neues vom Tage  – WDR Rundfunkorchester Köln
Conductor: Jan Latham-Koenig
Principal singers: Elisabeth Werres (Laura), Claudio Nicolai, (Eduard), Ronald Pries (Hermann) / Horst Hiestermann (Herr M), Martina Borst (Frau M), Oscar Garcia de Gracia (Hotel director), Arwed Sandner (registrar) / Celso Antunes (1st manager; head waiter), Wolf Geuer (2nd manager), Thomas Donecker (3rd manager), Christoph Scheeben (4th manager; guide), Dieter Gillessen (5th manager), Heribert Feckler: bass (6th manager), Sabine Bitter (room maid)
Recording date: 1987
Label: WERGO – 28 61922 (CD)

References

Notes

Sources

Skelton, Geoffrey (1992). "Neues vom Tage" in The New Grove Dictionary of Opera, ed. Stanley Sadie, London: Macmillan Reference 
 Hindemith, Paul (2003). Neues vom Tage. Lustige Oper in drei Teilen (Sämtliche Werke I,7-1) ed. Giselher Schubert, Mainz: Schott Musik International

External links

Page about the Aachen production in 2000

Operas by Paul Hindemith
German-language operas
Operas
1929 operas
Zeitoper